A Joyful Noise is the fifth and final studio album by American indie rock band Gossip, released on May 11, 2012, by Columbia Records. The album was produced by Xenomania founder Brian Higgins.

Critical reception

A Joyful Noise received generally mixed reviews from music critics. At Metacritic, which assigns a normalized rating out of 100 to reviews from mainstream publications, the album received an average score of 60, based on 24 reviews, which indicates "mixed or average reviews". Andy Gill of The Independent gave the album four out of five stars, writing that "the involvement of Brian Higgins on A Joyful Noise enables the group to break new ground with confidence". The Guardians Caroline Sullivan gave the album three out of five stars and stated that "it's Girls Aloud producer Higgins to the rescue, with a sound influenced by Abba and Madonna. Having said that, Gossip—especially Beth Ditto, in waspishly fine voice here—seem very much at home with it." However, Priya Elan of NME felt that "[g]ood moments are squandered by unsatisfying choruses and/or weak lyrics." The Independent on Sundays Simon Price expressed that after a few years of career, Ditto "already feels like a footnote", adding that the band pairing up with Higgins "should be a stroke of genius, but Higgins has caught Ditto & co at a point where they appear to have disastrously lost their fire."

Commercial performance
A Joyful Noise debuted at number 100 on the Billboard 200, selling 5,000 copies in its first week. In Europe, the album debuted at number 47 on the UK Albums Chart with first-week sales of 2,822 copies, while reaching number one in Switzerland, number two in Germany, number three in France, number four in Austria and number eight in Belgium.

Track listing

Personnel
Credits adapted from the liner notes of A Joyful Noise.

Gossip
 Beth Ditto – vocals
 Hannah Blilie – drums, percussion
 Nathan Howdeshell – live bass, guitars, keyboards, programming

Additional musicians
 Jeremy Sherrer – additional percussion
 Brian Higgins – additional programming ; additional composition 
 Luke Fitton – additional programming
 Owen Parker – additional programming
 Toby Scott – additional programming ; additional composition 
 Matt Gray – additional programming
 Joshua Jenkin – additional programming
 Sam Martin – additional programming
 Jerry Bouthier – additional programming
 Andrea Gorgerino – additional programming
 Fred Falke – additional programming ; additional composition 
 Jason Resch – additional programming ; additional composition 
 Kieran Jones – additional programming ; additional composition

Technical
 Brian Higgins – production ; mixing 
 Gossip – additional production
 Toby Scott – special production assistance, engineering ; mixing 
 Jeremy Sherrer – engineering
 Ben Taylor – recording engineering assistance
 Matt Gray – mixing 
 Rich Costey – mixing 
 Chris Kasych – logic engineering 
 Serban Ghenea – mixing 
 John Hanes – engineering for mix 
 Phil Seaford – engineering assistance 
 Tom Coyne – mastering

Artwork
 Rankin – photography
 Mike Larremore – additional photography
 Jeri Lynn – art direction

Charts

Weekly charts

Year-end charts

Certifications

Release history

References

2012 albums
Columbia Records albums
Gossip (band) albums